The Four Agreements: A Practical Guide to Personal Freedom is a self-help book by bestselling author Don Miguel Ruiz. The book offers a code of conduct claiming to be based on ancient Toltec wisdom that advocates freedom from self-limiting beliefs that may cause suffering and limitation in a person's life.

First published in 1997, the book has sold over 12 million copies in the US and has been translated into 48 languages worldwide. The book gained popularity after being endorsed by Oprah Winfrey on The Oprah Winfrey Show in 2001 and again on the television show in 2013. The book was also on the New York Times bestseller list for over a decade.

Overview 
The book takes inspiration from a set of spiritual beliefs held by the ancient Toltec people to help readers transform their lives into a new experience of freedom, true happiness, and love. According to the author, everything a person does is based on 'agreements' they have made with themselves, with others, with God, and with life itself. In these agreements, people may tell themselves who they are, how to behave, what is possible, and what is impossible. Some agreements that individuals create may not cause issues, but there are certain agreements that come from a place of fear and have the power to deplete one's emotional energy as well as diminish the self-worth of a person. The book states that these self-limiting agreements are what creates needless suffering. Ruiz also believes that to find personal joy, one must get rid of society-imposed and fear-based agreements that may subconsciously influence the behavior and mindset of the individual. Another basic premise of the book suggests that much of suffering is self-created and that most of the time, individuals have the ability to transform themselves and the negative thoughts they may have about situations occurring within their life. The author identifies sources of unhappiness in life and proposes four beneficial agreements that one can make with oneself to improve one's overall state of well-being. By making a pact with these four key agreements, an individual is able to dramatically impact the amount of happiness they feel in their lives, regardless of external circumstances.

Agreement 1: Be Impeccable With Your Word 
Ruiz states that while this agreement is the most important, it is the most difficult one to honor. For this agreement, Ruiz first analyzes the word "impeccable". The word impeccable comes from the Latin word peccatus meaning "sin", and the "im" in the beginning of impeccable is the Latin prefix that means "without". Ruiz describes a sin to be anything that goes against oneself, and therefore being impeccable with language means to take responsibility for one's actions and remain without judgment against oneself and others. In essence, this agreement focuses on the significance of speaking with integrity and carefully choosing words before saying them aloud.

Agreement 2: Don't Take Anything Personally 
The second agreement provides readers with a way to deal with hurtful treatment from others that they may experience in life. It advocates the importance of having a strong sense of self and not needing to rely on the opinions of others in order to be content and satisfied with their self-image. This agreement also allows readers to understand the notion that each individual has a unique worldview that alters their own perceptions, and that the actions and beliefs of a person is a projection of their own personal reality. Ruiz believes that anger, jealousy, envy, and even sadness can lessen or dissipate once an individual stops taking things personally.

Agreement 3: Don't Make Assumptions 
The third agreement describes the issue of making assumptions, how it leads to suffering, and why individuals should not partake in making them. When one assumes what others are thinking, it can create stress and interpersonal conflict because the person believes their assumption is a representation of the truth. Ruiz believes that a solution to overcoming the act of making an assumption is to ask questions and ensure that the communication is clear between the persons involved.

Agreement 4: Always Do Your Best 
The fourth agreement allows readers to have better insight into achieving progress towards their goals in life. This agreement entails integrating the first three agreements into daily life and also living to one's full potential. It involves doing the best that one can individually manage, which varies from the different situations and circumstances that the individual may encounter. Ruiz believes that if one does their best in any given moment, they will be able to avoid self-judgment and regret. By incorporating the first three agreements and doing the best they can in all facets of life, individuals will be able to live a life free from sorrow and self-ridicule.

Reception 
The book was originally published in 1997 by Amber-Allen publishing in San Rafael, California. The book has been translated into 48 languages including Spanish, French, German, Italian, Portuguese, Arabic, Chinese, Korean, Bulgarian, Mongolian, Turkish, Slovak, Czech, and Armenian. An illustrated edition was later published by the same company in 2010 to celebrate the 15th anniversary of the book.

In 2001, the book was featured in O, The Oprah Magazine, where the author had an interview with comedian and television host Ellen DeGeneres regarding the book. The book was also featured on The Oprah Winfrey Show in 2001 and on the television show Super Soul Sunday in 2013. The book spent over two years on Publishers Weekly bestsellers list and spent over a decade on the New York Times bestseller list.

Ashley Rao of Tragedy Assistance Program for Survivors wrote that "Regardless of where we land on the spiritual spectrum—from skeptic to believer and across religious creeds—the application of Ruiz's tenets offers opportunities for transformation within our journey through grief." Rachel Thompson of HuffPost says the book "is an extremely helpful book you can put into daily practice in dealing with criticism of any kind."

Tom Brady holds the book in high regard, crediting it with helping him recover from the trauma of the Deflategate controversy.  He told a reporter: "I take everything from it... There isn't a wrong word in that book."

Formats 
In addition to the book and audiobook, there is also an eBook, a four-color illustrated book, a card-deck, a companion book, and an online course available.

References

External links 
 Official website / TheFourAgreements.com
 The Four Agreements on Amber-Allen Publishing

1997 non-fiction books
Self-help books
Neoshamanism books
Bibliotherapy books